The Kansas Department of Transportation (KDOT) is a state government organization in charge of maintaining public roadways of the U.S. state of Kansas.

Funding issues

Since 2012, over $2 billion has been diverted from its coffers to the Kansas general fund and state agencies, earning it the nickname "the bank of KDOT", and jeopardizing the agency's ability to maintain roads in the state.

Organization

 Secretary of Transportation
 Deputy Secretary of Transportation
State Transportation Engineer
 Planning and Development Division
 Aviation Division
 Engineering and Design Division
 Operations Division
 District 1 – Topeka
 District 2 – Salina
 District 3 – Norton
 District 4 – Chanute
 District 5 – Hutchinson
 District 6 – Garden City
 Deputy Secretary of Transportation for Finance and Administration
 Finance Division
 Administration Division
 Special Assistant to the Secretary and Director of Public Affairs
 Chief Counsel
 Inspector General

References

External links
 
Kansas Department of Transportation Annual Reports (KGI Online Library)
Kansas Department of Transportation News Releases, 1999-present (KGI Online Library)
Other Kansas Department of Transportation publications available at KGI Online Library
Early history of State Highway Commssion of Kansas from KGI Online Library

Transportation
State departments of transportation of the United States
Transportation in Kansas